James "Jerry" Dawson (30 October 1909 – 19 January 1977) was a Scottish footballer who played as a goalkeeper and spent most of his career with Rangers.

Career
Born in Falkirk, Dawson's position as a goalkeeper saw him nicknamed 'Jerry' after the famous English custodian with whom he shared a surname. He began his career playing with local Junior side Camelon, before turning professional with Rangers in November 1929. He spent the next 16 years with the Ibrox side, winning the Scottish league five times and the Scottish Cup twice. He made 236 league appearances for Rangers and was capped 14 times by Scotland between 1934 and 1939. He also appeared 11 times for the Scottish Football League XI.

Dawson moved to home-town club Falkirk in 1945 and retired at the end of the 1948–49 season. After a spell as a journalist with the Daily Record, he moved into coaching when appointed East Fife's manager in July 1953. He guided his new side to the League Cup within months of his appointment but eventually left the Fifers in July 1958, after they suffered relegation to Division Two.

Dawson's contribution to Scottish football has been recognised by former club Rangers and he was posthumously elected to their Hall of Fame. He was nicknamed "The Prince in the Yellow Jersey" (this was the colour traditionally worn by the club's goalkeepers).

References

External links

1909 births
1977 deaths
Footballers from Falkirk
East Fife F.C. managers
Falkirk F.C. players
Association football goalkeepers
Rangers F.C. players
Scotland international footballers
Scottish Football League players
Scottish Junior Football Association players
Scottish football managers
Scotland wartime international footballers
Scottish Football League representative players
Scottish Football League managers
Camelon Juniors F.C. players
Scottish footballers